Presidential elections were held in Portugal on 29 May 1915. Following the resignation of president Manuel de Arriaga, an election was held to see who would complete the remainder of his term. Portugal's 1911 constitution stated that the Congress of the Republic must elect the president in Lisbon instead of the Portuguese people.

Teófilo Braga, the former President of the Provisional Government was elected to replace Manuel de Arriaga with almost unanimous support from Congress, becoming the second President of the Republic.

Results

References

1915 elections in Europe
1915 elections in Portugal
Presidential elections in Portugal
May 1915 events